Rustic capitals is an ancient Roman calligraphic script. Because the term is negatively connoted supposing an opposition to the more 'civilized' form of the Roman square capitals, Bernhard Bischoff prefers to call the script canonized capitals. The script was used for writing secular texts.

History 
The script was used between the 1st century and the 9th century, most often between the 4th and 6th centuries. After the 5th century, rustic capitals began to fall out of use, but they continued to be used as a display script in titles and headings, along with uncial as the script of the main text.

Structure 
Rustic capitals are similar to Roman square capitals, but are less rigid, influenced more by pen and ink writing on papyrus or parchment. The letters are thinner and more compressed, use many more curved lines than do square capitals, and have descenders extending below the baseline.

Syntax 
The scripts written in rustic capitals utilize punctus marks (dots which are placed between the words) to denote word separation, contrary to the common practice of scriptura continua (the continuous writing of words without any form of separation see Uncial Script).

Surviving works 

About fifty manuscripts with rustic capitals survive, including four copies of works by Virgil (including the Vergilius Vaticanus and the Vergilius Romanus), one copy of a work by Terence, and one of a work by Prudentius. The script was usually used for de luxe copies of pagan authors; the only works by Christian authors which use this script are those by Prudentius and Sedulius.

See also
 Roman cursive
 Roman square capitals

References

External links

 'Manual of Latin Palaeography' (A comprehensive PDF file containing 82 pages profusely illustrated, 5th edition, January 2017).

Latin language in ancient Rome
Latin-script calligraphy
Palaeography
 
Papyrology
Writing
Medieval scripts
Early Middle Ages
Western calligraphy